Queen Charlotte was a smack launched in 1802 in Berwick for the Old Ship Company of Berwick. She repelled in 1804 the attack of a French privateer in a single-ship action. A collier ran Queen Charlotte down and sank her on 26 October 1826.

Career
Queen Charlotte first appeared in Lloyd's Register (LR) in 1802. The Old Ship Company advertised that she had been armed by the government. The government had a program of arming merchantmen to enable them to protect themselves from French privateers.
 

On 24 January 1804, the packet Queen Charlotte, under the command of William Nisbett and belonging to the Old Shipping Company, of Berwick, encountered a French privateer cutter of 14 guns. The privateer fired a shot and called on Nisbet to surrender. Nisbett fired back and an engagement of more than an hour and a half ensued before the privateer sailed away empty-handed. In the fight, Nisbett and another seaman were wounded.

Fate
Queen Charlotte, James Nicholson, master, left Leith on 16 October 1827 with 11 passengers and 76 puncheons of "superior whisky" destined for a "gude Scott" of London. On 27 October the collier Silvia (or ), of Shields ran into her off Lowestoffe and cut her in half. Nicholson barely had time to get his crew and passengers aboard Silvia before Queen Charlotte sank without a trace.

Notes, citations, and references

Notes

Citations

References 

1802 ships
Age of Sail merchant ships of England
Maritime incidents in October 1827
Packet (sea transport)